Podosoje may refer to several places:

In Croatia
Podosoje, Runovići, a village near Runovići
Podosoje, Vrlika

In Bosnia and Herzegovina
Podosoje, Bileća
Podosoje, Kotor Varoš, a village near Kotor Varoš
Podosoje, Ravno, a village near Ravno
Podosoje, Srebrenica
Podosoje, Šipovo, a village near Šipovo
Podosoje, Trebinje